Maple Terrace Court and Walton Apartments is a group of historic dwellings located at Charleston, West Virginia.  Maple Terrace Court is a row of -story brick urban townhouses built in 1914 in the Colonial Revival-style with each two-bay residential units featuring slate-shingled gable roofs with gabled dormers, concrete foundations scored to resemble cut stone, and brick front porches. The Walton Apartments is a three-story unadorned brick apartment building is of utilitarian construction originally built with four one-bedroom residential units per floor.

It was listed on the National Register of Historic Places in 2002.

References

Apartment buildings in West Virginia
Houses in Charleston, West Virginia
Colonial Revival architecture in West Virginia
Houses completed in 1914
Houses on the National Register of Historic Places in West Virginia
National Register of Historic Places in Charleston, West Virginia